Charles W. Juels (1944 – January 21, 2009) was an American amateur astronomer and psychiatrist by profession, who became a prolific discoverer of minor planets after his retirement.

Juels was born in New York City in 1944, and grew up in Cincinnati, Ohio. In 1969 he graduated from Cincinnati College of Medicine. After his retirement as a psychiatrist in Phoenix, Arizona, he began hunting for minor planets at his private Fountain Hills Observatory, in Fountain Hills, Arizona.  He quickly became noted when he was credited with the discovery of 65 numbered minor planets during the first 18 months of his short career as a discoverer of minor planets.

In total, Juels is credited by the Minor Planet Center (MPC) with the discovery of 475 minor planets made between 1999 and 2003, and ranks as one of the world's top discoverers on the MPC charts.

In December 2002, Juels and Paulo R. Holvorcem won the "Harvard–Smithsonian 2003 Comet Award" for their joint charge-coupled device (CCD) electronic-camera discovery of C/2002 Y1, a near-parabolic comet.

He died on January 21, 2009, at the age of 64. The main-belt asteroid 20135 Juels, discovered by Paul G. Comba in 1996, was named in his honor. Naming citation was published on 9 March 2001.

List of discovered asteroids 

As of 2016, the MPC credits Juels with the discovery of 475 numbered minor planets, discovered between 1999 and 2003. Several of his discoveries were named after people, in particular after astronomers such as 24105 Broughton and 24101 Cassini.

References

External links 
 Charles Juels – Condolences, Guest book

1944 births
2009 deaths
American psychiatrists
Discoverers of asteroids
Discoverers of comets

Jewish American scientists
20th-century American Jews
21st-century American Jews
20th-century American astronomers
Astronomers